The large moth family Crambidae contains the following genera beginning with "N":

References 

 N
Crambid